The 31st News & Documentary Emmy Awards were held on September 27, 2010, at Rose Hall, Home of Jazz at Lincoln Center, located in the Time Warner Center in New York City. Awards were presented in 41 categories, including Breaking News, Investigative Reporting, Outstanding Interview, and Best Documentary. In attendance were over 900 television and news media industry executives, news and documentary producers and journalists.

Notable awards included the Lifetime Achievement Award given to documentary filmmaker Frederick Wiseman. PBS NewsHour received the Chairman's Award, with it being accepted by longtime news anchor Jim Lehrer, former anchor Robert MacNeil, longtime executive producer Les Crystal, and current executive producer Linda Winslow.

Winners

Network breakdown
The following chart is a breakdown of number of awards won this awards season per station.

Breakdown by program

Awards

Nominees
 By station
 By award category

Presenters
 Diane Sawyer, anchor, ABC World News
 Lester Holt, weekend anchor, NBC Nightly News and weekend co-anchor, Today
 Sheila Nevins, President, HBO Documentary Films
 Dan Rather, anchor and managing editor, Dan Rather Reports
 Bob Simon, correspondent, 60 Minutes
 Paula Zahn, Executive Producer/Host, On the Case with Paula Zahn
 Paula A. Kerger, President and CEO- PBS
 Roger Mudd, former Washington correspondent for CBS News, NBC News and the MacNeil/Lehrer NewsHour

References

External links
 Official Site
 Official Program
 List of Nominees

31
2010 television awards
2010 in New York City
September 2010 events in the United States